Suzanne Barbara Plesman (born October 23, 1971, in The Hague, South Holland) is a former field hockey defense and midfield player from the Netherlands, who played 39 international matches for the Dutch National Women's Team. She made her debut on April 28, 1995, in a friendly match against England (3-3), and won the gold medal with the Netherlands at the 1995 Women's EuroHockey Nations Championship and the bronze medal at the 1996 Summer Olympics. Plesman retired from international competition after those Atlanta Games.

References
 Dutch Hockey Federation

External links
 

1971 births
Field hockey players at the 1996 Summer Olympics
Dutch female field hockey players
Living people
Olympic field hockey players of the Netherlands
Olympic bronze medalists for the Netherlands
Field hockey players from The Hague
Olympic medalists in field hockey
Medalists at the 1996 Summer Olympics
HGC players
20th-century Dutch women
21st-century Dutch women